The Matsu Blue Tears Ecological Museum is a museum in Nangan Township, Lienchiang County, Taiwan.

History
The museum building used to be the a fishery research institute. Later on it was turned into a museum with cooperation with National Taiwan Ocean University.

Architecture
The museum features a café.

See also
 List of museums in Taiwan

References

Museums in Lienchiang County
Nangang Township